The General Pershing WWI casualty list was a list of casualties released to the media by the American military during World War I. Newspapers like the Evening Public Ledger (EPL) would title the list's summary, General Pershing Reports or Pershing Reports. The name General Pershing refers to General John Pershing, who was in command of the American Expeditionary Forces (AEF), the expeditionary force of the United States during World War I. While fighting the Germans on the Western Front the AEF would take daily casualties in the form of those killed in action (KIA), those who died from their wounds, those who died from disease, accidental deaths, soldiers missing in action (MIA) and soldiers wounded in action (WIA). These numbers would be tabulated by the American military and then released to the American news media.

After the war, the real numbers were mined from the military bureaucracy as opposed to the fog of war. During World War I, 4,734,991 served in the American military. There were a total of 116,516 deaths, with 53,402 of those occurring in battle. Another 63,114 died of noncombat reasons, including about 45,000 due to the 1918 outbreak of Spanish flu; 30,000 soldiers died before they even reached France. Of those that survived the war, 204,002 were wounded in some way.

The list
One of the publications that printed this data along with the names who were reported dead and wounded was the Evening Public Ledger, a Philadelphia newspaper published from March 25, 1836, to January 1942. On November 5, 1917, the EPL published a story with the headline "Casualty List In First Action Thrills Nation". In the article it listed the first three American deaths in the war: McLean County, Kentucky's Corporal James Bethel Gresham, Private Merle Hay from Glidden, Iowa, and Private Thomas Enright of Pittsburgh, Pennsylvania. They had been killed in a skirmish on November 3, 1917. In addition to the three Americans KIA the casualty list printed that five were WIA and twelve soldiers were MIA. Initially, the casualty lists were published with casualty's name and their address. From March 9, 1918, the list was "denatured" or stripped of home addresses. On April 2, 1918, the American military prevented the publication of all casualty lists from the American War Department decreeing that the only source for casualty lists would be the American command headquarters in France.

April 1919

March 1919
{| role="presentation" class="wikitable mw-collapsible"
|-
!Date
!Total dead
!Total KIA
!Total dead from wounds
!Total dead from disease
!Total dead from accidents
!Total MIA
!Total WIA
!Total casualties 
!References
|-
|-
|March 31, 1919|| || || || || || || || ||  
|-
|March 30, 1919|| || || || || || || || ||Sunday  
|-
|March 29, 1919||71145||31977||13386||22038||3744||5421||194184||270750|| 
|-
|March 28, 1919||71105||31968||13375||22018||3744||5417||194155||270677|| 
|-
|March 27, 1919||71018||31960||13368||21962||3728||5416||194052||270486|| 
|-
|March 26, 1919||70928||31952||13363||21920||3693||5412||193905||270245|| 
|-
|March 25, 1919||70865||31948||13356||21882||3679||5407||193887||270159|| 
|-
|March 24, 1919||70812||31945||13353||31840||3674||5407||198708||269927|| 
|-
|March 23, 1919|| || || || || || || || ||Sunday  
|-
|March 22, 1919||70422||31867||13339||21733||3483||5728||193450||269600|| 
|-
|March 21, 1919|| || || || || || || || ||  
|-
|March 20, 1919||70051||31856||13332||21454||3409||5714||192640||268405|| 
|-
|March 19, 1919||69876||31849||13325||21350||3352||5712||192373||267961|| 
|-
|March 18, 1919||69705||31843||13322||21240||3300||5712||191969||267386|| 
|-
|March 17, 1919||69587||31837||13315||21168||3267||5708||191811||267106|| 
|-
|March 16, 1919|| || || || || || || || ||Sunday  
|-
|March 15, 1919||69543||31828||13327||21164||3224||6096||191611||267250|| 
|-
|March 14, 1919||69434||31821||13320||21079||3214||6094||191422||266950|| 
|-
|March 13, 1919||69259||31807||13299||20966||3187||6093||191411||266763|| 
|-
|March 12, 1919||69057||31795||13286||20822||3154||6091||191211||266359|| 
|-
|March 11, 1919||68953||31776||13286||20751||3140||6088||191072||266117|| 
|-
|March 10, 1919</td>|| 
|-
|March 9, 1919|| || || || || || || || ||Sunday 
|-
|March 8, 1919||68608||31745||13241||20535||3087||6348||191126||266082|| 
|-
|March 7, 1919||68533||31733||13231||20482||3087||6348||190868||265749|| 
|-
|March 6, 1919||68404||31729||13222||20387||3066||6343||190756||265503|| 
|-
|March 5, 1919||68268||31721||13212||20275||3060||6341||190308||264917|| 
|-
|March 4, 1919||68209||31707||13212||20242||3048||6341||190027||264577|| 
|-
|March 3, 1919||68104||31707||13198||20181||3018||6937||189702||264173|| 
|-
|March 2, 1919|| || || || || || || || ||Sunday  
|-
|March 1, 1919||68049||31653||13214||20173||3009||6933||199231||274213||
|}

February 1919

January 1919

December 1918

November 1918

October 1918

September 1918

August 1918

July 1918

June 1918

May 1918

April 1918

March 1918

February 1918

January 1918

December 1917

November 1917

See also

 Deadliest single days of World War I
 List of maritime disasters in World War I
 List of battles with most United States military fatalities
 World War I casualties

Bibliography 
Notes

References 

 - Total pages: 38
 - Total pages: 288 

 

Lists of battles
Battles
War casualties